The Brend is a river in Bavaria.

Brend may also refer to:

Brend (mountain), in Baden-Württemberg, Germany
Brend (surname)
Brend, a term coined by philosopher and artist Henry Flynt referring to "pure recreation"